Samba Camara (born 14 November 1992) is a professional footballer who plays as a defender for Turkish club Sivasspor. Born in France, he represents Mali internationally.

Club career 
On 23 December 2019 Camara signed with New England Revolution. On 20 January 2020 the deal became void after Camara's P-1 visa application was denied.

International career
Born in France, Camara is of Malian descent. He made his debut for Mali national football team on 24 March 2021 in an Africa Cup of Nations qualifier against Guinea.

Honours
Sivasspor
 Turkish Cup: 2021–22

References

External links

Living people
1992 births
Footballers from Le Havre
Citizens of Mali through descent
Malian footballers
Mali international footballers
French footballers
French sportspeople of Malian descent
Association football defenders
Le Havre AC players
Sivasspor footballers
Ligue 2 players
Süper Lig players
Malian expatriate footballers
French expatriate footballers
Expatriate footballers in Turkey